The Athlon 64 microprocessor from Advanced Micro Devices (AMD) is an eighth-generation central processing unit (CPU). Athlon 64 is targeted at the consumer market.

Features overview

Single-core desktop processors

Athlon 64
"Code name" (Steppings, Process)

"ClawHammer" (C0 & CG, 130 nm)
 All models support: MMX, SSE, SSE2, Enhanced 3DNow!, NX bit, AMD64, Cool'n'Quiet

"Newcastle" (CG, 130 nm)
 All models support: MMX, SSE, SSE2, Enhanced 3DNow!, NX bit, AMD64, Cool'n'Quiet

"Winchester" (D0, 90 nm)
 All models support: MMX, SSE, SSE2, Enhanced 3DNow!, NX bit, AMD64, Cool'n'Quiet

"Venice" (E3 & E6, 90 nm)
 All models support: MMX, SSE, SSE2, SSE3, Enhanced 3DNow!, NX bit, AMD64, Cool'n'Quiet

"Manchester" (E4, 90 nm)
 Athlon 64 X2 dual-core with one core disabled
 All models support: MMX, SSE, SSE2, SSE3, Enhanced 3DNow!, NX bit, AMD64, Cool'n'Quiet

"San Diego" (E4, 90 nm)
 All models support: MMX, SSE, SSE2, SSE3, Enhanced 3DNow!, NX bit, AMD64, Cool'n'Quiet

"Toledo" (E6, 90 nm)
 Athlon 64 X2 dual-core with one core disabled
 All models support: MMX, SSE, SSE2, SSE3, Enhanced 3DNow!, NX bit, AMD64, Cool'n'Quiet

"Orleans" (F2 & F3, 90 nm)  
 All models support: MMX, SSE, SSE2, SSE3, Enhanced 3DNow!, NX bit, AMD64, Cool'n'Quiet, AMD-V

"Lima" (G1 & G2, 65 nm)
 All models support: MMX, SSE, SSE2, SSE3, Enhanced 3DNow!, NX bit, AMD64, Cool'n'Quiet, AMD-V

Athlon 64 FX

"SledgeHammer" (C0 & CG, 130 nm)
 All models support: MMX, SSE, SSE2, Enhanced 3DNow!, NX bit, AMD64

"ClawHammer" (CG, 130 nm)
 All models support: MMX, SSE, SSE2, Enhanced 3DNow!, NX bit, AMD64, Cool'n'Quiet

"San Diego" (E4, 90 nm)
 All models support: MMX, SSE, SSE2, SSE3, Enhanced 3DNow!, NX bit, AMD64, Cool'n'Quiet

Dual-core desktop processors

Athlon 64 X2

"Manchester" (E4, 90 nm) 
 All models support: MMX, SSE, SSE2, SSE3, Enhanced 3DNow!, NX bit, AMD64, Cool'n'Quiet

"Toledo" (E6, 90 nm) 
 All models support: MMX, SSE, SSE2, SSE3, Enhanced 3DNow!, NX bit, AMD64, Cool'n'Quiet

"Windsor" (F2 & F3, 90 nm) 
 All models support: MMX, SSE, SSE2, SSE3, Enhanced 3DNow!, NX bit, AMD64, Cool'n'Quiet, AMD-V

"Brisbane" (G1 & G2, 65 nm) 
 All models support: MMX, SSE, SSE2, SSE3, Enhanced 3DNow!, NX bit, AMD64, Cool'n'Quiet, AMD-V

Athlon X2

Athlon 64 FX

"Toledo" (E6, 90 nm) 
 All models support: MMX, SSE, SSE2, SSE3, Enhanced 3DNow!, NX bit, AMD64, Cool'n'Quiet

"Windsor" (F2, 90 nm) 
 All models support: MMX, SSE, SSE2, SSE3, Enhanced 3DNow!, NX bit, AMD64, Cool'n'Quiet, AMD-V

"Windsor" (Quad FX platform, F3, 90 nm) 
 All models support: MMX, SSE, SSE2, SSE3, Enhanced 3DNow!, NX bit, AMD64, Cool'n'Quiet, AMD-V
 Usually sold in pairs

Mobile processors

Mobile Athlon 64

"ClawHammer" (C0 & CG, 130 nm)
 All models support: MMX, SSE, SSE2, Enhanced 3DNow!, NX bit, AMD64, PowerNow!

"Odessa" (CG, 130 nm)
 All models support: MMX, SSE, SSE2, Enhanced 3DNow!, NX bit, AMD64, PowerNow!

"Oakville" (D0, 90 nm)
 All models support: MMX, SSE, SSE2, Enhanced 3DNow!, NX bit, AMD64, PowerNow!

"Newark" (E5, 90 nm, 62W TDP)
 All models support: MMX, SSE, SSE2, SSE3, Enhanced 3DNow!, NX bit, AMD64, PowerNow!

Athlon Neo

"Huron" (65 nm, 15W TDP)
 All models support: MMX, SSE, SSE2, SSE3, Enhanced 3DNow!, NX bit, AMD64, PowerNow!, AMD-V

"Sherman" (65 nm, 15W TDP)
 All models support: MMX, SSE, SSE2, SSE3, Enhanced 3DNow!, NX bit, AMD64, PowerNow!, AMD-V

Athlon Neo X2

"Conesus" (65 nm)
 All models support: MMX, SSE, SSE2, SSE3, Enhanced 3DNow!, NX bit, AMD64, AMD-V

Notes

See also
 List of AMD microprocessors

References

External links
 AMD Technical Documentation
 AMD Processors for Desktops: AMD Phenom, AMD Athlon FX, AMD Athlon X2 Dual-Core, AMD Athlon, and AMD Sempron Processor
 sandpile.org – AA-64 implementation – AMD K8
 AMD 64 OPN reference guide – Fab51
 Socket AM2 CPUs listed, specced, priced up – The Inquirer
 Chip identification by model number

Athlon 64
Lists of microprocessors